Telecommunications in the Maldives is under the control and supervision of the Communications Authority of Maldives (CAM). The Maldives is served by three telecommunications operators, Dhiraagu, Ooredoo Maldives and Raajjé Online.

Telephones
Mobile network operators (MNOs): 2, Dhiraagu and Ooredoo Maldives (2020)

Telephones - Fixedline's in use:
21,000 (1999)

Telephones - Mobile Cellular:
344,000 (2007)

Telephone system:
domestic: interatoll communication through microwave links; all inhabited islands are connected with telephone and fax service.
international: satellite earth station - 3 Intelsat (Indian Ocean)

Radio and Television
Radio broadcast stations:
AM 1, FM 5, shortwave 1 (2008)

Radios:
35,000 (1999)

Television broadcast stations:
9 (2009)

Televisions:
10,000 (1999)

Internet
Internet Service Providers (ISPs):
3, Dhiraagu, Ooredoo Maldives and Raajjé Online (2020)

Internet users:
20,000 (2008)

Country code (Top level domain): .mv

MV Domain registrar: Dhiraagu

See also
Dhiraagu
Ooredoo Maldives
Raajjé Online

External links
Website of Dhiraagu
Website of Ooredoo Maldives
Website of Raajjé Online

 
 
Internet in the Maldives